Gerard Davis (born 25 September 1977) is a footballer who plays for New Zealand club Glenfield Rovers.

The defender made his full New Zealand debut in a 3–1 win over Vanuatu on 21 June 2000, and went on to make 23 A-international appearances, his final appearance in a 0–3 loss to Iran on 12 October 2003.

Davis was included in the New Zealand 2003 Confederations Cup squad, playing in all three group games.

References

External links

1977 births
Living people
New Zealand association footballers
New Zealand international footballers
National Soccer League (Australia) players
Veikkausliiga players
Stanford Cardinal men's soccer players
Tampere United players
Football Kingz F.C. players
New Zealand expatriate association footballers
Association football midfielders
Association football defenders
2000 OFC Nations Cup players
2002 OFC Nations Cup players
2003 FIFA Confederations Cup players
Expatriate footballers in Finland
New Zealand expatriate sportspeople in Finland